Hannes Olof Gösta Alfvén (30 May 1908 – 2 April 1995) was a Swedish electrical engineer, plasma physicist and winner of the 1970 Nobel Prize in Physics for his work on magnetohydrodynamics (MHD).  He described the class of MHD waves now known as Alfvén waves. He was originally trained as an electrical power engineer and later moved to research and teaching in the fields of plasma physics and electrical engineering.  Alfvén made many contributions to plasma physics, including theories describing the behavior of aurorae, the Van Allen radiation belts, the effect of magnetic storms on the Earth's magnetic field, the terrestrial magnetosphere, and the dynamics of plasmas in the Milky Way galaxy.

Education 

Alfvén received his PhD from the University of Uppsala in 1934. His thesis was titled "Investigations of High-frequency Electromagnetic Waves."

Early years 

In 1934, Alfvén taught physics at both the University of Uppsala and the Nobel Institute for Physics (later renamed the Manne Siegbahn Institute of Physics) in Stockholm, Sweden. In 1940, he became professor of electromagnetic theory and electrical measurements at the Royal Institute of Technology in Stockholm. In 1945, he acquired the nonappointive position of Chair of Electronics. His title was changed to Chair of Plasma Physics in 1963. From 1954 to 1955, Alfvén was a Fulbright Scholar at the University of Maryland, College Park. In 1967, after leaving Sweden and spending time in the Soviet Union, he moved to the United States. Alfvén worked in the departments of electrical engineering at both the University of California, San Diego and the University of Southern California.

Later years 
In 1991, Alfvén retired as professor of electrical engineering at the University of California, San Diego and professor of plasma physics at the Royal Institute of Technology in Stockholm.

Alfvén spent his later adult life alternating between California and Sweden. He died at the age of 86.

Research 
In 1937, Alfvén argued that if plasma pervaded the universe, it could then carry electric currents capable of generating a galactic magnetic field. After winning the Nobel Prize for his works in magnetohydrodynamics, he emphasized that:

In order to understand the phenomena in a certain plasma region, it is necessary to map not only the magnetic but also the electric field and the electric currents. Space is filled with a network of currents which transfer energy and momentum over large or very large distances. The currents often pinch to filamentary or surface currents. The latter are likely to give space, as also interstellar and intergalactic space, a cellular structure.

His theoretical work on field-aligned electric currents in the aurora (based on earlier work by Kristian Birkeland) was confirmed in 1967, these currents now being known as Birkeland currents.

Alfvén's work was disputed for many years by the senior scientist in space physics, the British mathematician and geophysicist Sydney Chapman.<ref>S. Chapman and J. Bartels, Geomagnetism," Vol. 1 and 2, Clarendon Press, Oxford, 1940.</ref>   Alfvén was regarded as a person with unorthodox opinions in the field by many physicists, R. H. Stuewer noting that "... he remained an embittered outsider, winning little respect from other scientists even after he received the Nobel Prize..." and was often forced to publish his papers in obscure journals. Alfvén recalled:

When I describe [plasma phenomena] according to this formalism most referees do not understand what I say and turn down my papers. With the referee system which rules US science today, this means that my papers are rarely accepted by the leading US journals.

Alfvén played a central role in the development of:

 Plasma physics
 Charged particle beams
 Interplanetary medium
 Magnetospheric physics
 Magnetohydrodynamics
 Solar phenomena investigation (such as the solar wind)
 Aurorae science

In 1939, Alfvén proposed the theory of magnetic storms and auroras and the theory of plasma dynamics in the earth's magnetosphere. This was the paper rejected by the U.S. journal Terrestrial Magnetism and Atmospheric Electricity.

Applications of Alfvén's research in space science include:

 Van Allen radiation belt theory
 Reduction of the Earth's magnetic field during magnetic storms
 Magnetosphere (protective plasma covering the Earth)
 Formation of comet tails
 Formation of the Solar System
 Dynamics of plasmas in the galaxy
 Physical cosmology

Alfvén's views followed those of the founder of magnetospheric physics, Kristian Birkeland. At the end of the nineteenth century, Birkeland proposed (backed by extensive data) that electric currents flowing down along the Earth's magnetic fields into the atmosphere caused the aurora and polar magnetic disturbances.

Areas of technology benefiting from Alfvén's contributions include:

 Particle accelerators
 Controlled thermonuclear fusion
 Hypersonic flight
 Rocket propulsion
 Reentry braking of space vehicles

Contributions to astrophysics:

 Galactic magnetic field (1937)
 Identified nonthermal synchrotron radiation from astronomical sources (1950)

Alfvén waves (low frequency hydromagnetic plasma oscillations) are named in his honor, and propagate at the Alfvén speed. Many of his theories about the solar system were verified as late as the 1980s through external measurements of cometary and planetary magnetospheres. However, Alfvén himself noted that astrophysical textbooks poorly represented known plasma phenomena:

A study of how a number of the most used textbooks in astrophysics treat important concepts such as double layers, critical velocity, pinch effects, and circuits is made. It is found that students using these textbooks remain essentially ignorant of even the existence of these concepts, despite the fact that some of them have been well known for half a century (e.g, double layers, Langmuir, 1929; pinch effect, Bennet, 1934).

Alfvén reported that of 17 of the most used textbooks on astrophysics, none mention the pinch effect, none mentioned critical ionization velocity, only two mentioned circuits, and three mentioned double layers.

Alfvén believed the problem with the Big Bang was that astrophysicists tried to extrapolate the origin of the universe from mathematical theories developed on the blackboard, rather than starting from known observable phenomena. He also considered the Big Bang to be a myth devised to explain creation. Alfvén and colleagues proposed the Alfvén–Klein model as an alternative cosmological theory to both the Big Bang and steady state theory cosmologies.

 Personal life 
Alfvén was married for 67 years to his wife Kerstin (1910–1992). They raised five children, one boy and four girls. Their son became a physician, while one daughter became a writer and another a lawyer in Sweden. The writer was Inger Alfvén and is well known for her work in Sweden. The composer Hugo Alfvén was Hannes Alfvén's uncle.

Alfvén studied the history of science, oriental philosophy, and religion. On his religious views, Alfven was irreligious and critical of religion. He spoke Swedish, English, German, French, and Russian, and some Spanish and Chinese. He expressed great concern about the difficulties of permanent high-level radioactive waste management." Alfvén was also interested in problems in cosmology and all aspects of auroral physics, and used Schröder's well known book on aurora, Das Phänomen des Polarlichts. Letters of Alfvén, Treder, and Schröder were published on the occasion of Treder's 70th birthday.Schröder, Wilfried, and  Hans Jürgen Treder. 1993. The earth and the universe: A festschrift in honour of Hans-Jürgen Treder. Bremen-Rönnebeck: Science Editions. The relationships between Hans-Jürgen Treder, Hannes Alfvén and Wilfried Schröder were discussed in detail by Schröder in his publications.

Alfvén died on 2 April, 1995 at Djursholm aged 86.

 Awards and honours 
The Hannes Alfvén Prize, awarded annually by the European Physical Society for outstanding contributions in plasma physics, is named after him. The asteroid 1778 Alfvén is named in his honour.

 Awards 

 Gold Medal of the Royal Astronomical Society (1967)
 Nobel Prize in Physics (1970) for his work on magnetohydrodynamics
 Franklin Medal of the Franklin Institute (1971)
 Lomonosov Gold Medal of the USSR Academy of Sciences (1971)
 Elected a  Foreign Member of the Royal Society (ForMemRS) in 1980
 William Bowie Medal of the American Geophysical Union (1988) for his work on comets and plasmas in the Solar System
 Member of Royal Swedish Academy of Sciences
 Member of Royal Swedish Academy of Engineering Sciences
 Life fellows of the Institute of Electrical and Electronics Engineers
 Member of European Physical Society
 Foreign Honorary Member of the American Academy of Arts and Sciences (1962)
 Member of the Yugoslav Academy of Sciences
 Contributor to the Pugwash Conferences on Science and World Affairs
 Member of the International Academy of Science
 Member of the Indian National Science AcademyElected member of the American Philosophical Society (1971) 

Alfvén was one of the few scientists who was a foreign member of both the United States and Soviet Academies of Sciences.

 Selected bibliography 
For full list of publications see.

Books 

Cosmical Electrodynamics, International Series of Monographs on Physics, Oxford: Clarendon Press, 1950. (See also 2nd Ed. 1963, co-authored with Carl-Gunne Fälthammar.)
Worlds-Antiworlds: Antimatter in Cosmology (1966).
The Great Computer: A Vision (1968) (a political-scientific satire under the pen name Olof Johannesson; publ. Gollancz).
Atom, Man, and the Universe: A Long Chain of Complications, W.H. Freeman and Company, 1969.
Living on the Third Planet, authored with Kerstin Alfvén, W.H. Freeman and Company, 1972. .
Cosmic Plasma, Astrophysics and Space Science Library, Vol. 82 (1981) Springer Verlag. 
Schröder, Wilfried, and  Hans Jürgen Treder. 2007. Theoretical physics and geophysics: Recollections of Hans-Jürgen Treder (1928–2006). Potsdam: Science Editions.

Articles 

 On the cosmogony of the solar system I (1942) | Part II | Part III
 Interplanetary Magnetic Field (1958)
 On the Origin of Cosmic Magnetic Fields (1961)
 On the Filamentary Structure of the Solar Corona (1963)
 Currents in the Solar Atmosphere and a Theory of Solar Flares (1967)
 On the Importance of Electric Fields in the Magnetosphere and Interplanetary Space (1967)
 Jet Streams in Space  (1970)
 Evolution of the Solar System (1976) with Gustaf Arrhenius (NASA book)
 Double radio sources and the new approach to cosmical plasma physics (1978) (PDF)
 Interstellar clouds and the formation of stars with Per Carlqvist (1978) (PDF)
 Energy source of the solar wind with Per Carlqvist (1980) (PDF) A direct transfer of energy from photospheric activity to the solar wind by means of electric currents is discussed.
 Electromagnetic Effects and the Structure of the Saturnian Rings (1981) (PDF)
 A three-ring circuit model of the magnetosphere with Whipple, E. C. and Jr.; McIlwain (1981) (PDF)
 The Voyager 1/Saturn encounter and the cosmogonic shadow effect (1981) (PDF)
 Origin, evolution and present structure of the asteroid region (1983) (PDF)
 On hierarchical cosmology (1983) (PDF) Progress in lab studies of plasmas and on their methods of transferring the results to cosmic conditions.
 Solar system history as recorded in the Saturnian ring structure (1983) (PDF)
 Cosmology – Myth or science? (1984) (PDF)
 Cosmogony as an extrapolation of magnetospheric research (1984) (PDF)

See also
Alfvén resonator
Astrophysical plasma
Heliospheric current sheet
Magnetic reconnection
Magnetohydrodynamic turbulence
Magnetosonic wave
Marklund convection
Plasma parameters
Plasma stability
Solar wind
Spheromak

References

 External links 

 Hannes Alfvén biography
  including the Nobel Lecture, December 11, 1970 Plasma Physics, Space Research and the Origin of the Solar System''
 Hannes Alfvén biography (Royal Institute of Technology in Stockholm, Sweden)
 Hannes Alfvén Biographical Memoirs (Proceedings of the American Philosophical Society)
 Papers of Hannes Olof Gosta Alfvén
 Hannes Alfvén Medal – awarded for outstanding scientific contributions towards the understanding of plasma processes in the solar system and other cosmical plasma environments
 Timeline of Nobel Prize Winners: Hannes Olof Gosta Alfvén
 Hannes Alfvén Papers (1945–1991) in the Mandeville Special Collections Library.
 
 QJRAS Obituary 37 (1996) 259
 Hannes Alfvén Birth Centennial 30 May 2008 (2008)

1908 births
1995 deaths
Critics of religions
People from Norrköping
Fellow Members of the IEEE
Foreign Members of the Royal Society
Foreign associates of the National Academy of Sciences
Nobel laureates in Physics
Religious skeptics
20th-century Swedish astronomers
Fluid dynamicists
Swedish pacifists
20th-century Swedish physicists
Swedish science fiction writers
Swedish electrical engineers
Uppsala University alumni
Academic staff of the KTH Royal Institute of Technology
Swedish Nobel laureates
Recipients of the Gold Medal of the Royal Astronomical Society
Recipients of the Lomonosov Gold Medal
Fellows of the American Academy of Arts and Sciences
Foreign Members of the USSR Academy of Sciences
Foreign Members of the Russian Academy of Sciences
Foreign Fellows of the Indian National Science Academy
University of California, San Diego faculty
University of Maryland, College Park faculty
Swedish plasma physicists
Members of the American Philosophical Society
Fulbright alumni